Celler may refer to:

People
 Branko Celler, Australian academic
 Emanuel Celler (1888–1981), American politician
 Miroslav Celler (1991–2023), Slovakian squash player

Places
 Celler Schloss or Celle Castle, Germany
 Serra d'En Celler, Spain

See also